Emanuela Pierantozzi (born 22 August 1968 in Bologna) is an Italian judoka.

She won two Olympic medals in different weight classes, in 1992 and 2000. She won three World Championship medals, two Gold (1989 WC 1991 WC) and one Bronze (1997 WC). Emanuela teaches Judo at Genoa University, Sport Science Course.

Emanuela is a sculptor with work displayed by the Art of the Olympians (AOTO).  She is also a board member of the Al Oerter Foundation (AOF) which runs the AOTO program.

References

External links
 
 
 
 
 https://web.archive.org/web/20160315141636/http://www.emanuelapierantozzi.com/wordpress/

1968 births
Living people
Sportspeople from Bologna
Italian female judoka
Judoka at the 1992 Summer Olympics
Judoka at the 1996 Summer Olympics
Judoka at the 2000 Summer Olympics
Olympic judoka of Italy
Olympic silver medalists for Italy
Olympic bronze medalists for Italy
Olympic medalists in judo
Medalists at the 2000 Summer Olympics
Medalists at the 1992 Summer Olympics
Mediterranean Games gold medalists for Italy
Mediterranean Games medalists in judo
Competitors at the 1997 Mediterranean Games
20th-century Italian women
21st-century Italian women